Everlast may refer to:
 Everlast (brand), a manufacturer of boxing equipment
 Everlast (musician) (born 1969), an American hip hop MC and singer

See also
 Everlasting (disambiguation)